The 1972–73 NBA season was the Kings 24th season in the NBA and their first season in the cities of Kansas City and Omaha.  This season, Nate Archibald won the scoring and assist titles and made the All-NBA 1st Team, but the Kings missed the playoffs.

Draft picks

Roster

Regular season

Season standings

z – clinched division title
y – clinched division title
x – clinched playoff spot

Record vs. opponents

Game log

Awards and records
 Joe Axelson, NBA Executive of the Year Award
 Nate Archibald, All-NBA First Team

References

Kansas City
Sacramento Kings seasons
Kansas
Kansas